Oxera crassifolia is a species of plant in the family Lamiaceae. It is endemic to New Caledonia.

References

Flora of New Caledonia
Lamiaceae
Conservation dependent plants
Taxonomy articles created by Polbot